António Monteiro Teixeira de Barros (2 October 1949 – 8 April 2018) was Portuguese professional footballer who played as defender.

In the summer of 1978 he played abroad in the National Soccer League with Montreal Castors. In 1980, he played in the Major Indoor Soccer League with Hartford Hellions.

Barros gained 7 caps for the Portugal national team.

Honours
Benfica
Primeira Liga: 1970–71, 1974–75, 1975–76, 1976–77

References

External links
 
 

1949 births
2018 deaths
Sportspeople from Matosinhos
Association football defenders
Leixões S.C. players
S.L. Benfica footballers
Montreal Castors players
Boavista F.C. players
Portimonense S.C. players
Hartford Hellions players
G.D. Estoril Praia players
Portugal international footballers
Primeira Liga players
Canadian National Soccer League players
Portuguese footballers
Portuguese expatriate footballers
Major Indoor Soccer League (1978–1992) players
Portuguese expatriate sportspeople in Canada
Portuguese expatriate sportspeople in the United States
Expatriate soccer players in Canada
Expatriate soccer players in the United States